Shanghai Aircraft Manufacturing Company, formerly Shanghai Aircraft Manufacturing Factory. It was founded in 1950 with a registered capital of 4 billion yuan, with two bases, Pudong and Dachang, with more than 5,000 employees. It is a Shanghai-based aerospace company with business in:

 aircraft manufacturing
 parts and components subcontractor
 repair and overhaul
 non-aerospace products: aerial ladders, hovercraft, glass wall manufacturing, Swerve rack for magnetic aerotrain

It now belongs to the Commercial Aircraft Corporation of China (COMAC) that was established in 2008.

Aims
It aims to continuously enhance:
 the assembly and integration
 core key component manufacturing
 supply chain construction and management
 new technology, new method, new material application and development
 manufacturing process control
 civil aircraft delivery
And aims to shoulder the important mission of the development of China's large aircraft.

Products

Regional Jets
 Comac ARJ21 - final assembly

Jetliners
 Shanghai Y-10 jetliner
 MD-82 jetliner
 MD-83 jetliner
 MD-90 jetliner
 Airbus single aisle family cargo door frame
 Boeing 737 tail section assembly & Boeing 777 vertical stabilizers .
 COMAC C919
 CRAIC CR929

References

External links
 

Aircraft manufacturers of China
Chinese companies established in 1950
Manufacturing companies based in Shanghai
Comac